Juan de Jesús Fernández de Alarcón (born December 13, 1956) is a Dominican actor best known for playing antagonist roles in movies.

Fernández was born in Santo Domingo, Dominican Republic. He made his movie debut in Salome and has gone to star in over 30 movies.

Filmography

Films

Television

External links

Dominican Republic emigrants to the United States
Hispanic and Latino American male actors
Living people
1956 births
American male film actors
American male television actors
20th-century American male actors
21st-century American male actors
People from Santo Domingo